Colonel Sir John Lowther (c. 1628 – March 1668) was an English landowner, at Hackthorpe, the eldest son and heir of Sir John Lowther, 1st Baronet and Mary Fletcher.

He first married, in 1665, Elizabeth Bellingham, daughter of Sir Henry Bellingham, 1st Baronet. They had two children:
John Lowther, 1st Viscount Lonsdale (1655–1700)
Mary Lowther, married her third cousin twice removed, John Lowther of Dantzic

By his second marriage to Mary Withins, he had one (posthumous) son:
William Lowther (1668–1694)

He predeceased his father and did not succeed to the baronetcy.

References
Lowther pedigree 2

English MPs 1661–1679
1620s births
1668 deaths
17th-century English landowners
Heirs apparent who never acceded
John